The Producers Guild Film Award for Best Director (previously known as the Apsara Award for Best Director) is given by the producers of the film and television guild as part of its annual award ceremony for Hindi films, to recognise the work of a film director. Following its inception in 2004, no one was awarded in 2005 and 2007.

Superlatives

Winners

See also
Producers Guild Film Awards
Producers Guild Film Award for Best Film
Producers Guild Film Award for Best Debut Director
Producers Guild Film Award for Best Actor in a Leading Role
Producers Guild Film Award for Best Actress in a Leading Role

References

Producers Guild Film Awards